A microsecond is a unit of time in the International System of Units (SI) equal to one millionth (0.000001 or 10−6 or ) of a second. Its symbol is μs, sometimes simplified to us when Unicode is not available.

Because the next SI prefix is 1000 times larger, measurements of 10−5 and 10−4 seconds are typically expressed as tens or hundreds of microseconds.

Examples

 1 microsecond (1 μs) – cycle time for frequency  (1 MHz), the inverse unit. This corresponds to radio wavelength 300 m (AM medium wave band), as can be calculated by multiplying 1 μs by the speed of light (approximately ).
 1 microsecond – the length of time of a high-speed, commercial strobe light flash (see air-gap flash).
 1 microsecond – protein folding takes place on the order of microseconds.
 1.8 microseconds – the amount of time subtracted from the Earth's day as a result of the 2011 Japanese earthquake.
 2 microseconds – the lifetime of a muonium particle
 2.68 microseconds – the amount of time subtracted from the Earth's day as a result of the 2004 Indian Ocean earthquake.
 3.33564095 microseconds – the time taken by light to travel one kilometre in a vacuum
 5.4 microseconds – the time taken by light to travel one mile in a vacuum (or radio waves point-to-point in a near vacuum)
 8.01 microseconds – the time taken by light to travel one mile in typical single-mode fiber optic cable
 10 microseconds (μs) – cycle time for frequency 100 kHz, radio wavelength 3 km
 18 microseconds – net amount per year that the length of the day lengthens, largely due to tidal acceleration.
 20.8 microseconds – sampling interval for digital audio with 48,000 samples/s
 22.7 microseconds – sampling interval for CD audio (44,100 samples/s)
 38 microseconds – discrepancy in GPS satellite time per day (compensated by clock speed) due to relativity
 50 microseconds – cycle time for highest human-audible tone (20 kHz)
 50 microseconds – to read the access latency for a modern solid state drive which holds non-volatile computer data
 100 microseconds (0.1 ms) – cycle time for frequency 10 kHz
 125 microseconds – common sampling interval for telephone audio (8000 samples/s)
 164 microseconds – half-life of polonium-214
 240 microseconds – half-life of copernicium-277
 260 to 480 microseconds - return trip ICMP ping time, including operating system kernel TCP/IP processing and answer time, between two gigabit ethernet devices connected to the same local area network switch fabric.
 277.8 microseconds – a fourth (a 60th of a 60th of a second), used in astronomical calculations by al-Biruni and Roger Bacon in 1000 and 1267 AD, respectively.
 489.67 microseconds – time for light at a 1550 nm frequency to travel 100 km in a singlemode fiber optic cable (where speed of light is approximately 200 million metres per second due to its index of refraction).
 The average human eye blink takes 350,000 microseconds (just over  second).
 The average human finger snap takes 150,000 microseconds (just over  second).
 A camera flash illuminates for 1,000 microseconds.
 Standard camera shutter speed opens the shutter for 4,000 microseconds or 4 milliseconds.
 584542 years of microseconds fit in 64 bits: (2**64)/(1e6*60*60*24*365.25)

See also
 International System of Units
 Jiffy (time)
 Orders of magnitude (time)
 Picosecond
 Millisecond

References

External links
 The National Institute of Standards and Technology (NIST)

Orders of magnitude (time)

de:Sekunde#Abgeleitete Maßeinheiten